Locquénolé is a commune in the Finistère department of Brittany in north-western France.

Toponymy
From the Breton lok which means hermitage (cf.: Locminé), and Guénolé a Breton saint.

Population
Inhabitants of Locquénolé are called in French Locquénolésiens.

See also
Communes of the Finistère department

References

External links

Mayors of Finistère Association 

Communes of Finistère